Kristian Omar Álvarez Núñez (born 20 April 1992) is a Mexican professional footballer who last played as centre-back for Spanish club Salamanca UDS.

Club career

Guadalajara
Álvarez was born in Zapotlanejo, Jalisco, Mexico. He was one of the young promises of the Club Deportivo Guadalajara. He was already captain of the Chivas sub-17 team. On 23 April 2011 he made his professional debut against Cruz Azul in a 1–1 draw. Jose Luis Real has described Alvarez as very talented, strong, great at marking and sweeping, having bravery and aggression to rush out and deal with any unexpected goal threats.

Santos Laguna 
On June 10, 2015, it was officially announced Kristian Alvarez would join Santos Laguna on loan.

Veracruz 
Alvarez joined Veracruz on a one-year loan.

International career

In the 2009 FIFA U-17 World Cup he was the captain on the Mexico U-17 team. Right-back Kristian Alvarez opened for Mexico with an amazing long-range lob. Diego De Buen scores a brilliant volley to also score in the 3–0 win over Canada.
Kristian Alvarez scored twice to help Mexico beat Guatemala 3-0 and reach the 2009 U-17 World Cup.

Career statistics

Club

Honours

Club
Santos Laguna
 Campeón de Campeones: 2015

International
Mexico U20
 CONCACAF U-20 Championship: 2011

References

External links
 
  
 
 

1992 births
Living people
Footballers from Guadalajara, Jalisco
Association football central defenders
Ascenso MX players
Liga MX players
C.D. Guadalajara footballers
Santos Laguna footballers
C.D. Veracruz footballers
Leones Negros UdeG footballers
Loros UdeC footballers
Segunda División B players
Salamanca CF UDS players
2011 Copa América players
Mexico youth international footballers
Mexico under-20 international footballers
Mexican footballers
Mexican expatriate footballers
Mexican expatriate sportspeople in Spain
Expatriate footballers in Spain